William Hall Holmes (1889–1933) was an English footballer who played for Stoke.

Career
Steel was born in Stoke-upon-Trent and played amateur football with Leek Alexandra before joining Stoke in 1912. He in nine matches and scored four goals for Stoke in two seasons before leaving in 1914 for Welsh club Mid Rhondda.

Career statistics

References

English footballers
Stoke City F.C. players
1889 births
1933 deaths
Mid Rhondda F.C. players
Association football midfielders